Gaius Julius Caesar may refer to:
 Julius Caesar, Roman dictator
 Gaius Julius Caesar (proconsul of Asia), father of the dictator
 Gaius Julius Caesar Strabo
 Gaius Julius Caesar, once the name of Roman emperor Augustus
 Gaius Caesar, grandson of Augustus
 Gaius Caesar, the Roman emperor Caligula